Bhattian is a village in the Phillaur tehsil of Jalandhar District of the Indian state of Punjab. The village is administered by the Sarpanch, an elected representative.

Demographics 
According to the 2011 Census, Bhatian has a population of 687. The village has a literacy rate of 78.77%, higher than the average literacy rate of Punjab.

Most villagers belong to a Schedule Caste (SC), comprising 79.04% of the total.

Education 
The village has a co-ed primary school (Pri Bhattian School) which provide a mid-day meal as per the Indian Midday Meal Scheme.

Transport 

The nearest international airport is located in Chandigarh.

References 

Villages in Jalandhar district
Villages in Phillaur tehsil